The women's 59 kg competition of the weightlifting events at the 2019 Pan American Games in Lima, Peru, was held on July 28 at the Coliseo Mariscal Caceres.

Results
10 athletes from seven countries took part.

New records

References

External links
Results

Weightlifting at the 2019 Pan American Games
2019 in women's weightlifting